Catherine "Cathy" Callaghan (October 31, 1931 – March 16, 2019) was Professor Emerita in the Department of Linguistics at the Ohio State University in Columbus, Ohio.

She received a Ph.D. in linguistics from the University of California, Berkeley in 1963. Her doctoral dissertation was a grammar of Lake Miwok, written under the supervision of Mary Haas. She then started work on the Lake Miwok Dictionary, which was published in 1965.  She was appointed Assistant Professor of Linguistics at the Ohio State University in 1965 and remained there until her retirement. She was named a Fellow of the American Association for the Advancement of Science in 1969.

Throughout her career Callaghan's research focused on the Penutian languages of California, especially connections between Yokuts and Miwok. She appeared briefly in the documentary, How Dead do I Look?, which was filmed in 2014. Her papers on Miwok Languages are collected at the California Language Archive.

In 1973, Callaghan co-founded Feminists for Life, an anti-abortion feminist non-profit. 

Callaghan died on March 16, 2019, in Columbus, Ohio.

Key publications 
 Callaghan, Catherine A. 1965. Lake Miwok Dictionary. University of California Press.
 Callaghan, Catherine A. 1970. Bodega Miwok Dictionary. Publications in Linguistics 60. University of California Press.
 Callaghan, Catherine A. 1984. Plains Miwok Dictionary. Publications in Linguistics 105. University of California Press.
 Callaghan, Catherine A. 1987. Northern Sierra Miwok Dictionary. Publications in Linguistics 110. University of California Press.
 Callaghan, Catherine A. 2012. Proto-Utian Grammar and Dictionary with notes on Yokuts. Trends in Linguistics Documentation 31. Berlin: De Gruyter Mouton.

References

External links 
 Catherine A. Callahan Papers on Miwok Languages

1931 births
2019 deaths
Women linguists
Ohio State University faculty
UC Berkeley College of Letters and Science alumni
Paleolinguists
Linguists of Penutian languages
Linguists of Yokutsan languages
Linguists of Utian languages
American anti-abortion activists
American feminists
Fellows of the American Association for the Advancement of Science